Intercostalis may refer to:
 Intercostales externi muscle
 Intercostales interni muscle